Penn–Wyatt House, also known as the Hoffman House, is a historic home located at Danville, Virginia. It was built in 1876, and modified between 1887 and 1903.  It is a two-story, stuccoed brick dwelling with  Italianate and Second Empire style architectural elements.  It features projecting bay windows, a central three-story entrance tower topped by a bell-cast mansard roof, brownstone quoining, a one-story porch with Ionic order columns, and a multi-gable roof.

It was listed on the National Register of Historic Places in 1979.  It is located in the Danville Historic District.

References

External links
 Penn–Wyatt House, 862 Main Street, Danville, Danville, VA at the Historic American Buildings Survey (HABS)

Houses on the National Register of Historic Places in Virginia
Italianate architecture in Virginia
Second Empire architecture in Virginia
Houses completed in 1876
Houses in Danville, Virginia
National Register of Historic Places in Danville, Virginia
Historic American Buildings Survey in Virginia
Historic district contributing properties in Virginia